Edward Frederick Sanderson is an American Congregational minister.

Edward Sanderson may also refer to:

Edward Sanderson, character in Best Friends Together
Edward Sanderson (chess player), see List of Canadian Chess Championship winners
Edward Sanderson (mayor), Mayor of Elizabeth, New Jersey